Vahram Martirosyan (Վահրամ Մարտիրոսյանը 1959, July 27, Gyumri) is an Armenian writer, screenwriter and journalist. His first novel, Landslide (2000) was a bestseller in Armenia, and one of the few modern Armenian novels translated abroad, as Glissement de terrain in French.

Publications (selection) 

 2000 – Soghankʻ
2002 – Hanun khachʻi tsptvatsnerě
2005 – Bverě: vipakner
 2006 – Glissement de terrain: roman
2010 – L'imbécile
2012 – Chʻarentsʻ: gegharvestakan kinonkari stsʻenar

Awards
 Balint Balassi Memorial Sword Award: 2020

References

External links
Vahram Martirosyan at media.am

1959 births
Living people
Armenian novelists
21st-century Armenian writers
21st-century Armenian screenwriters